Sant'Angelo Limosano is a comune (municipality) in the Province of Campobasso in the Italian region Molise, located about  northwest of Campobasso.

Sant'Angelo Limosano borders the following municipalities: Fossalto, Limosano, Lucito, Salcito, San Biase, Trivento.

Demographic evolution

See also
 Molise Croats

References

Cities and towns in Molise